Dahan-e Tangal (also Romanized as Dahān-i-Tangal and Dahan Tangal; also known as Dahaneh-ye Tangal) is a village in Doreh Rural District, in the Central District of Sarbisheh County, South Khorasan Province, Iran. At the 2006 census, its population was 14, in 4 families.

References 

Populated places in Sarbisheh County